Terrance Joseph Robiskie (born November 12, 1954) is a former American football coach and player. He previously served as an assistant coach for the Buffalo Bills, Tennessee Titans, Atlanta Falcons, Miami Dolphins, Cleveland Browns, Washington Redskins, Los Angeles Raiders, and Jacksonville Jaguars.

Early life and playing career
He attended Second Ward High School in Edgard, Louisiana, where he was a star quarterback. After high school, he went to Louisiana State University, where he was converted to a running back for LSU's football team. During his senior year, in 1976, he was a first-team All-SEC running back. He was the first LSU running back to run for over 200 yards in a single game, gaining 214 yards in 30 attempts against Rice University in 1976. He was also the first LSU running back to run for over 1,000 yards in a season (1976), and the first LSU running back to run for over 2,500 yards in a career (1973–76).

Robiskie was drafted in the eighth round by the Oakland Raiders. He spent five years in the NFL as a running back with the Raiders (1977–79) and the Miami Dolphins (1980–81), while playing for acclaimed coaches John Madden, Tom Flores, and Don Shula. Robiskie was a role player, rushing for only 553 yards and five touchdowns in five seasons before injury forced his retirement.

Coaching career

Los Angeles Raiders
Robiskie entered the coaching profession with the Los Angeles Raiders in 1982 as the assistant running backs coach, where he tutored Marcus Allen to two Pro Bowls and two 1,000-yard seasons. Robiskie was the assistant special teams coach for the Raiders from 1985 to 1987, and he tutored tight ends in 1988.

Robiskie was the offensive coordinator for the Raiders from 1989 to 1993. In 1990, the Raiders ranked ninth in the NFL with 126.8 yards rushing per game and quarterback Jay Schroeder ranked sixth in the NFL with a 90.8 passer rating. In 1992, the Raiders ranked 11th in the NFL with 112.1 yards rushing. In 1993, the Raiders ranked fifth in the NFL in passing and 13th in total offense as Robiskie helped quarterback Jeff Hostetler pass for 3,242 yards and 14 touchdowns. Robiskie's 12 years with the Raiders included seven playoff stints, four division titles, and a 38–9 victory over the Washington Redskins in Super Bowl XVIII.

Washington Redskins
Robiskie spent the next seven years with the Washington Redskins as an offensive assistant coaching wide receivers. He began the 2000 season as passing game coordinator in Washington and helped the Redskins rank fifth in the NFC in total offense (337.3 yards per game) and passing (228.0 yards per game). He helped running back Stephen Davis total 1,318 yards and 11 touchdowns on 332 attempts, including five 100-yard outings. He concluded the 2000 season as the Redskins head coach for the final three games of the regular season following the departure of Norv Turner. Robiskie's record as head coach was 1–2, including a 20–3 win over Arizona on December 24.

Cleveland Browns
Robiskie joined the Browns in 2001 as wide receivers coach and held that role through 2003.
In 2004, he was named offensive coordinator, but late in the season was named interim head coach replacing Butch Davis, who resigned under fire for producing the lowest offensive yards, lowest points scored, and most turnovers in the league. His record was 1–4 in the interim role. Robiskie interviewed as permanent head coach, but that job went to Romeo Crennel. Robiskie then openly campaigned to remain as an assistant and was named wide receivers coach in February 2005. He was fired in January 2007.

Miami Dolphins
Shortly after being fired by the Browns, Robiskie was hired as the wide receivers coach for the Miami Dolphins. He was on the same Washington Redskins staff as former Dolphins head coach Cam Cameron from 1994 to 1996.

Atlanta Falcons
On January 26, 2008, Robiskie was hired by the Atlanta Falcons to be their wide receivers coach. He served in that capacity for eight seasons and was considered influential in the development of homegrown stars Julio Jones and Roddy White into legitimate offensive targets for Matt Ryan. Robiskie's contract with the Falcons was not renewed after the 2015 season.

Tennessee Titans
On January 18, 2016, Robiskie was hired by the Tennessee Titans as the team's offensive coordinator. His contract with the Titans was not renewed after the 2017 season.

Buffalo Bills

On February 14, 2018, Robiskie was hired by the Buffalo Bills as the team's wide receivers coach. He was fired after one season on January 2, 2019.

Jacksonville Jaguars
On January 16, 2019, Robiskie was hired by the Jacksonville Jaguars as the team's running backs coach.

Head coaching record

* – Interim head coach

Personal life

Robiskie and his wife, Cynthia, have three sons, Brian, Andrew, and Kyle. Brian was a wide receiver and Andrew was a center.

References

External links
 pro-football-reference.com profile

1954 births
Living people
African-American coaches of American football
American football wide receivers
Atlanta Falcons coaches
Buffalo Bills coaches
Cleveland Browns coaches
Cleveland Browns head coaches
LSU Tigers football players
Miami Dolphins players
Miami Dolphins coaches
National Football League offensive coordinators
Oakland Raiders coaches
Oakland Raiders players
People from New Orleans
People from St. John the Baptist Parish, Louisiana
Players of American football from New Orleans
Sportspeople from New Orleans
Washington Redskins coaches
Washington Redskins head coaches
Tennessee Titans coaches
People from Edgard, Louisiana
21st-century African-American people
20th-century African-American sportspeople